Universal Corporation is one of the world's leading tobacco merchants. Incorporated in 1886, Universal is headquarters in Richmond, Virginia, in the United States.

Current operations
Universal buys, sells, and processes flue-cured and burley tobacco. It also holds a 49% interest in Socotab, LLC, a large dealer in oriental leaf tobaccos. The company does not manufacture cigarettes or other consumer tobacco products, although its largest customer is Altria Group (owner of Philip Morris USA).

Universal common stock is part of the S&P 600 index.

History
After the 1911 breakup of the American Tobacco Company trust, Jacquelin (sic) P. Taylor incorporated Universal out of six formerly independent leaf merchants.

In 2010, Universal along with Alliance One International were accused of violations of the Foreign Corrupt Practices Act of 1977. The company is alleged to have paid US$10,000 to the wife of an official in the Mozambique Ministry of Agriculture to secure favorable tax treatment in that country. In 2010, Universal paid about $10 million in restitution and penalties to settle the charges.

On January 3, 2020, Universal purchased FruitSmart.

References

External links
Company Home Page
Company History

Companies listed on the New York Stock Exchange
Tobacco companies of the United States
American companies established in 1886
Companies based in Richmond, Virginia
1918 establishments in Virginia
Agriculture companies established in 1918